Willa Holland (born ) is an American actress and model. She is known for her roles as Kaitlin Cooper in the Fox teen drama The O.C., Agnes Andrews in The CW series Gossip Girl, Aqua in Kingdom Hearts, and Thea Queen / Speedy in Arrow.

Early life
Holland grew up with two sisters: Brianna Holland and Piper De Palma. Holland attended Palisades Charter High School for only six weeks because her career was taking off and school peers were dismissive of her acting pursuits.

Career
At age seven, Holland was playing at her stepfather Brian de Palma’s neighbor's house in The Hamptons, New York. The neighbor, Steven Spielberg, was filming home videos and told Holland's parents, "You've got to put her in front of a camera."
Upon returning to Los Angeles that September, Holland signed with Ford Modeling Agency at age seven, and immediately booked a shoot for Burberry. She has modeled for Guess, Gap, Abercrombie & Fitch and Ralph Lauren.

In 1999, De Palma took Holland to a theatrical talent agency. Since then, she has appeared in many national commercials. In 2001, when Holland was ten, she worked alongside her father in Ordinary Madness. She was even slated to co-star in the 2005 Fox series The Inside with fellow model Rachel Nichols, but left the show when writer Tim Minear was brought in to overhaul it. She initially played the role of Kaitlin Cooper on The O.C., replacing Shailene Woodley, as a recurring character in season 3, and then as a regular in season four.

In December 2007, Holland was cast in the independent drama film Garden Party, playing the role of April, a troubled teenage aspiring model who tries to make it in Los Angeles. In September 2008, The CW announced Holland would appear in three episodes of the second season of the teen-drama television series Gossip Girl, created by The O.C. creator Josh Schwartz. Holland played the role of a rebellious 16-year-old model who befriends and creates havoc for Jenny Humphrey (Taylor Momsen). In March 2010, Holland made a one-off return in the 16th episode of the third season, "The Empire Strikes Jack".

In May 2010, Square Enix announced she would be voicing Aqua in the PlayStation Portable title, Kingdom Hearts Birth by Sleep, which was released on September 7, 2010, in North America. That same year, Holland starred in her first major studio film, the apocalyptic thriller film Legion, playing the role of a bratty teenager. She played Janice Heddon in the film Straw Dogs (2011), a remake of the 1971 film of the same name.

In February 2012, Holland was cast in The CW action-adventure series Arrow, which is based on the Green Arrow comic books, where she played Thea Queen / Speedy, the sister of Oliver Queen / Green Arrow. She remained a regular cast member in the series until 2018, during the sixth season.

In the 2012 film Tiger Eyes, Holland played Davey Wexler. The film was based on the 1981 novel of the same name written by Judy Blume.

Filmography

Awards and nominations

References

External links

Living people
21st-century American actresses
Actresses from Los Angeles
American child actresses
American female models
American film actresses
American people of English descent
American people of Italian descent
American television actresses
American voice actresses
American video game actresses
Female models from California
Year of birth missing (living people)